Joulupuu on rakennettu ("Christmas tree is built") is a Finnish christmas carol that is among the most well-known among the Finnish population.

The song was first published by the name "Joulu-kuusi" in 1876 in the schoolbook "Uusi Kuwa-Aapinen", instructing that it should be sung with the traditional folk melody that was known at that time as Lapsen Laulu (Song of a Child), a song published by :fi:Jaakko Juteini originally in 1819, and the final stable version in 1835.

Lyrics

Due to the childlike lyrics, this Christmas carol is sung mostly in preschools, elementary schools, and in family parties where young children are present.

See also

List of Christmas carols
Sylvian Joululaulu
Varpunen Jouluaamuna

References

Finnish songs
Christmas carols